"Alone Again" is a power ballad written and released by the American heavy metal band Dokken on their 1984 album Tooth and Nail. The single reached #64 on the Billboard Hot 100 and #20 on the Hot Mainstream Rock Tracks chart in 1985. The song was written by singer Don Dokken and bassist Jeff Pilson.

Composition

Don Dokken wrote the song in 1975 or 1976, when he was 22 or 23, recorded it on a cassette, and it stayed in a closet for nearly a decade. During the recording of Tooth and Nail, many other glam metal bands at the time were releasing ballads, so Elektra Records told Dokken they needed a ballad. This prompted Don to search his closet and rediscover the song, which he reworked with bassist Jeff Pilson in the studio. "People ask me all the time, 'Who did you write it about?' I don't know. 'Was it about a girlfriend?' I don't know! I just wrote it. My memory's not that good," said Dokken.

Music video
Its lyrics talk about a man's depression after a break-up. The music video had a story similar to a lot of other power ballads. Almost 70% of it is filmed in black and white along with some coloured scenes. It shows the band performing the song live along with some shots of Don Dokken being alone in a room.

Track listing
US 7" single

Alone Again / Just Got Lucky 7" and 12" single

CD single

Charts

Personnel
 Don Dokken – vocals
 George Lynch – guitar
 Jeff Pilson – bass guitar, keyboards
 Mick Brown – drums

References

1984 singles
1980s ballads
Dokken songs
Glam metal ballads
Song recordings produced by Roy Thomas Baker
Song recordings produced by Tom Werman
Songs written by Jeff Pilson
1984 songs
Elektra Records singles
Songs written by Don Dokken